Insinger, Saskatchewan is an unincorporated area in the rural municipality of Insinger No. 275, Saskatchewan, in the Canadian province of Saskatchewan.  Insinger is located on Saskatchewan Highway 16, the Yellowhead in south eastern Saskatchewan.  Lawrie post office first opened in 1898  at the legal land description of Sec.6, Twp.29, R.7, W2.  It changed names in 1907 to Insinger and moved to Sec.21, Twp.29, R.8, W2 .  The population is smaller than a hamlet, and is counted within the Insinger No. 275, Saskatchewan, however it is still listed as a village at Geonames.  Insinger is located between Yorkton and Foam Lake.  Insinger is located within  of Whitesand Regional Park.

See also

List of communities in Saskatchewan
List of rural municipalities in Saskatchewan

References

Former villages in Saskatchewan
Ghost towns in Saskatchewan
Insinger No. 275, Saskatchewan